Till Ireland a Nation is the sixth studio album by the Irish folk and rebel band the Wolfe Tones. The album features a number of political songs including The Boys of the Old Brigade and Broad Black Brimmer

Track listing 
Highland Paddy - 3:32
 Traveling Doctor's Shop - 3:15
 My Green Valleys - 3:34
 The Boys of the Old Brigade - 2:58
 Children of Fear - 4:28
 The Boys of Fair Hill - 1:39
 The Bodenstown Churchyard - 3:56
 The Grandfather - 3:30
 The Blackbird of Sweet Avondale - 3:54
 Broad Black Brimmer - 2:38
 Laugh and the World Laughs with You - 3:23
 A Soldier's Life - 2:17
 Give Me Your Hand - 3:12
 Must Ireland Divided Be - 3:53
 Ireland Over All - 2:42

Personnel
The Wolfe Tones
 Tommy Byrne - lead vocals, guitars
 Brian Warfield - banjo, rhythm guitar, tin whistle
 Noel Nagle - tin whistle, bagpipes
 Derek Warfield - mandolin, backing vocals
Additional personnel
 Pat Keohane - bass guitar

References

The Wolfe Tones albums
1974 albums